Canal Lewisville is an unincorporated community and census-designated place (CDP) in Coshocton County, Ohio, in the United States. As of the 2010 census it had a population of 320.

History
Canal Lewisville had its start by the building of the Ohio Canal through that territory. It was laid out as a town in 1832 by T. Butler Lewis and others, and named for the former. A post office called Canal Lewisville was established in 1845, and remained in operation until 1915.

Geography
Canal Lewisville is located in east-central Coshocton County on the border of Keene and Tuscarawas townships.

Demographics

References

Census-designated places in Coshocton County, Ohio